Spider-Man 2 is a 2004 American superhero film directed by Sam Raimi and written by Alvin Sargent from a story by Alfred Gough, Miles Millar and Michael Chabon. Based on the fictional Marvel Comics character of the same name, it is the second installment in Raimi's Spider-Man trilogy and the sequel to Spider-Man (2002), starring Tobey Maguire alongside Kirsten Dunst, James Franco, Alfred Molina, Rosemary Harris, and Donna Murphy. Set two years after the events of Spider-Man, the film finds Peter Parker struggling to stop Dr. Otto Octavius from recreating the dangerous experiment that kills his wife and leaves him neurologically fused to mechanical tentacles, while also dealing with an existential crisis between his dual identities that appears to be stripping him of his powers.

Principal photography began in April 2003 in New York City and also took place in Los Angeles. Reshoots took place later that year and concluded in December. Spider-Man 2 was released in both conventional and IMAX theaters on June 30, 2004. It received widespread acclaim from critics, who praised its emotional weight and visual effects, as well as Maguire and Molina's performances and Raimi's direction, and grossed $789 million worldwide, making it the third-highest-grossing film of the year. The film won Best Visual Effects at the 77th Academy Awards, and was also nominated for Best Sound Mixing and Best Sound Editing; furthermore, it received five awards at the Saturn Awards, including Best Fantasy Film and Best Director for Raimi. The film is widely regarded as one of the greatest superhero films ever made and a blueprint for future movies in the genre. Its success led to Spider-Man 3 (2007).

Plot

Two years after becoming Spider-Man, Peter Parker is estranged from both his love interest Mary Jane Watson and his best friend, Harry Osborn, and discovers that his Aunt May is facing eviction. He finds himself suffering temporary but recurring losses of his powers, often in life-threatening situations. Harry, who is now head of Oscorp's genetic and scientific research division, is sponsoring a fusion power project by nuclear scientist Otto Octavius, who befriends and mentors Peter. While handling hazardous materials, Octavius wears a harness of powerful robotic tentacle arms with artificial intelligence.

During a public demonstration that Peter and Harry attend, a power spike causes the fusion reactor to destabilize. Octavius refuses to shut down the reactor, which goes critical, killing his wife and burning the inhibitor chip blocking the arms from his nervous system. As Spider-Man, Peter manages to shut the experiment down. At a hospital, doctors prepare to surgically remove Octavius' harness. Without the inhibitor chip, the arms have become sentient and defend themselves by killing the doctors. Afterward, Octavius takes refuge at a harbor. Now corrupted by the arms' AI, he decides to re-try his experiment and robs a bank to fund it. The Daily Bugle dubs the scientist "Doctor Octopus".

Mary Jane becomes engaged to astronaut John Jameson, the son of Bugle editor J. Jonah Jameson. Peter suffers an emotional breakdown over his inability to balance his life, with the stress stripping him of his powers as a result. He quits being Spider-Man, returns to his normal life, and attempts to reconcile with Mary Jane. He also finally confesses to Aunt May the truth about Uncle Ben's death. Aunt May forgives him, but the rise in the city's crime rates worries Peter.

Requiring the isotope tritium to fuel his reactor, Octavius visits Harry to demand it. Harry agrees in exchange for Spider-Man, whom he still believes is responsible for his father's death. He tells Octavius to seek Peter, whom Harry believes is friends with Spider-Man, but tells him to not harm Peter. Octavius locates Peter, tells him to find Spider-Man, and captures Mary Jane. Her endangerment leads to Peter's powers returning, and he goes after Octavius.

As they battle, they fall onto a New York City Subway train. Octavius sabotages it and leaves Peter to save the derailing train, which he does at a great physical toll. Octavius captures the now-weakened Peter and delivers him to Harry. Harry prepares to kill Spider-Man, only to be shocked to see Peter under the mask. Peter convinces Harry to put their conflict aside and direct him to Octavius' lair. They battle again as the nuclear reaction starts threatening the city. Peter reveals his identity and persuades Octavius to let his dream go for the greater good. Octavius commands the tentacles to obey him and sacrifices himself to destroy the experiment. Mary Jane sees Peter's true identity, which he says is why they cannot be together.

Meanwhile, Harry is visited by a vision of his father in a mirror, pleading for Harry to avenge his death, but Harry refuses to hurt Peter. Enraged, Harry shatters the mirror, inadvertently revealing a secret room containing his father's Green Goblin equipment. On her wedding day, Mary Jane abandons John at the altar and runs to Peter's apartment. After they kiss, they hear police sirens, and Mary Jane encourages him to go help as Spider-Man.

Cast
 Tobey Maguire as Peter Parker / Spider-Man:A superhero, Columbia University physics student, and photographer for the Daily Bugle. Juggling these separate lives means he briefly gives up his responsibilities as a superhero in a moment of adversity.
 Kirsten Dunst as Mary Jane Watson: An aspiring Broadway actress and a friend Peter has loved since he was a child, yet he gave up the chance of being with her out of concern for her safety. Still harboring feelings for Peter, Mary Jane begins dating John Jameson and eventually becomes engaged to him, in an effort to make Peter jealous. She also has a crush on Spider-Man, who saved her life numerous times in the past, and is unaware that the hero and Peter are one and the same.
 James Franco as Harry Osborn: Oscorp's current CEO, Norman Osborn's son and Peter's best friend, who holds his alter-ego Spider-Man responsible for his father's death. He is also Mary Jane's ex-boyfriend and still harbors feelings for her.
 Alfred Molina as Dr. Otto Octavius / Doctor Octopus:A scientist working on behalf of Oscorp and Peter's role model and mentor who goes insane after his failure to create a self-sustaining fusion reaction, which also resulted in the death of his wife, Rosie. Octavius is bonded with his handling equipment, four artificially intelligent mechanical tentacles, which influence his mentality and convince him that he must finish his experiment at all costs.
 Rosemary Harris as May Parker: Ben Parker's widow and Peter's aunt.
 Donna Murphy as Rosie Octavius: Otto's wife and assistant.

J. K. Simmons reprises his role as J. Jonah Jameson, the miserly manager and editor-in-chief of the Daily Bugle, while Daniel Gillies portrays his son John Jameson, an astronaut and Mary Jane's fiancé. Christine Estabrook appears briefly as Jameson's wife and John's mother.

As with the previous film, Bruce Campbell has a cameo appearance, this time as an usher who refuses Peter entry for arriving late to Mary Jane Watson's show. Spider-Man co-creator Stan Lee portrays a man on the street who saves a woman from falling debris during a battle between Spider-Man and Doctor Octopus. Dylan Baker portrays Dr. Curt Connors, one of Peter's college physics professors and a colleague of Octavius, while Willem Dafoe reprises his role as Norman Osborn, Harry's deceased father who appears to him as a hallucination. Dafoe came up with the idea during promotion for Spider-Man, which he compared to King Hamlet haunting his son to avenge him. Elizabeth Banks, John Paxton, Ted Raimi and Bill Nunn reprise their roles as Betty Brant, Osborn family butler Bernard Houseman, Ted Hoffman, and Robbie Robertson, respectively. Elya Baskin portrays Mr. Ditkovitch, Peter's landlord, (whose name is a reference to Spider-Man co-creator Steve Ditko) and Mageina Tovah plays his daughter Ursula. Cliff Robertson reprises his role as Peter's uncle Ben Parker in a flashback.

Scott Spiegel portrays a man who attempts to eat some pizza Spider-Man is delivering, only to have it webbed from his hands. Elyse Dinh portrays a violinist. Joel McHale portrays Mr. Jacks, a bank teller. Hal Sparks portrays an elevator passenger who has a conversation with Spider-Man. Donnell Rawlings portrays the New Yorker who exclaims that Spider-Man "stole that guy's pizzas" and Emily Deschanel portrays a receptionist. Brent Briscoe plays the garbage man who finds Spider-Man's costume in the trash and gives it to Jameson. Peter McRobbie plays an OsCorp representative. Reed Diamond plays Algernon. Peyton List and her brother Spencer List make their film debuts playing a little girl and boy playing on steps respectively. Daniel Dae Kim plays Raymond, an assistant of Otto Octavius working in his laboratory. Aasif Mandvi portrays Mr. Aziz, the owner of Joe's Pizza. Joey Diaz, Dan Hicks and Chloe Dykstra portray train passengers. Vanessa Ferlito portrays Louise, one of Mary Jane's co-stars. Joy Bryant appears as a spectator that witnesses Spider-Man in action. John Landis plays one of the doctors who operate on Doctor Octopus. Phil LaMarr portrays a train passenger who is most easily seen to the left of Spider-Man (the viewer's right) while the hero uses webbing to slow the train down. Gregg Edelman portrays Dr. Davis.

Production

Development
Immediately after finishing Spider-Man, director Sam Raimi with help from James Keltie signed into directing a sequel. In April 2002, Sony hired Smallville alumni, Alfred Gough and Miles Millar to write a script of the film. On May 8, 2002, following Spider-Man record-breaking $115 million opening weekend, Sony Pictures announced a sequel for 2004. Entitled The Amazing Spider-Man, after the character's main comic book title, the film was given a budget of $200 million and aimed for a release date of May 7, 2004. The following month, David Koepp was added to co-write with Gough and Millar. Koepp originally wanted to do the Gwen Stacy and Harry Osborn story and have Gwen to be killed in the middle of the second movie.

In September 2002, Michael Chabon was hired to rewrite. His draft had a younger Doc Ock, who becomes infatuated with Mary Jane. His mechanical limbs use endorphins to counteract the pain of being attached to his body, which he enjoys. When he injures two muggers on a date, this horrifies Mary Jane and in the resulting battle with Spider-Man his tentacles are fused together, and the fusion begins to kill him. In the script, Octavius is the creator of the genetically-altered spider from the first film, and gives Peter an antidote to remove his powers: this means when Octavius is dying with his tentacles, he wants to extract Spider-Man's spine to save himself. This leads to an alliance with Harry (a detail which made it into the finished film). Beforehand, Harry and the Daily Bugle put a $10 million price on Spider-Man's head, causing the city's citizens to turn against him.

Raimi sifted through the previous drafts by Gough, Millar, Koepp and Chabon, picking what he liked with screenwriter Alvin Sargent. He felt that thematically the film had to explore Peter's conflict with his personal wants against his responsibility, exploring the positive and negatives of his chosen path, and how he ultimately decides that he can be happy as a heroic figure. Raimi said that he took inspiration from Superman II (1980) for the story of Peter giving up his responsibilities. Although the story takes some partial influence from Doc Ock's debut in 1963 and the 1966 storyline If This Be My Destiny...!, the story was mostly inspired by the 1967 storyline Spider-Man No More!, specifically The Amazing Spider-Man #50. It was decided that Doctor Octopus would be kept as the villain, as he was both a visually interesting villain who was a physical match for Spider-Man, and a sympathetic figure with humanity, accompanied by the fact that the character had been repeatedly considered as a villain for the first film over the course of its 15-year development. Raimi changed much of the character's backstory, however, adding the idea of Otto Octavius being a hero of Peter, and how their conflict was about trying to rescue him from his demons rather than kill him.

Casting
When Tobey Maguire signed on to portray Spider-Man in 2000, he was given a three-film contract. After filming Seabiscuit in late 2002, a pre-existing back condition that Maguire suffered from was bothering him. Raimi heard that Tobey could be paralyzed if there was an injury in his back. Raimi also told Maguire, "I don't think we'll make the picture with you." Jake Gyllenhaal was cast to replace Maguire; the two actors so resemble each other that "a source close to Maguire" reportedly said that, had Gyllenhaal taken over the role, "A year from now? The public wouldn't know the difference". Maguire's girlfriend's father Ronald Meyer—head of Universal Studios—helped the actor regain the role, with a salary of $17 million. Gyllenhaal would later say in a 2019 interview saying that he was one of the several actors considered to replace Maguire.

Several actors were considered for the part of Doctor Octopus, including Ed Harris, Chris Cooper, and Christopher Walken; Molina was cast as Octavius in February 2003 and underwent physical training for the role. The reaction to his casting was mixed. Raimi had been impressed by his performance in Frida and also felt that his large physical size was true to the comic book character. Molina only briefly discussed the role and was not aware that he was a strong contender. He was a big fan of Marvel Comics and was excited to get the part. Although he was not familiar with Doc Ock, Molina found one element of the comics that he wanted to maintain, the character's cruel, sardonic sense of humor.

Filming

Spider-Man 2 was shot on over one hundred sets and locations, beginning with a pre-shoot on the Loop in Chicago during two days in November 2002. The crew acquired a train of 2200 series cars, placing sixteen cameras for background shots of Spider-Man and Doc Ock's train fight. Filming was originally slated to start in January but was pushed back to April so that Maguire could finish Seabiscuit. Principal photography began on April 12, 2003 in New York City and Chicago. The crew moved on May 13 to Los Angeles, shooting on sets created by production designer Neil Spisak. After the scare surrounding his back pains, Tobey Maguire relished performing many of his stunts, even creating a joke of it with Raimi, creating the line "My back, my back" as Spider-Man tries to regain his powers. Raimi said while filming the scene he yelled at Maguire to get to the edge of the building but Maguire refused to do it. Even Rosemary Harris took a turn, putting her stunt double out of work. In contrast, Alfred Molina joked that the stunt team would "trick" him into performing a stunt time and again. J. K. Simmons said that while filming the scene where Spider-Man gets his suit back from The Daily Bugle, when Simmons said "he's a thief" his fake-teeth popped out of his mouth.

Filming was put on hiatus for eight weeks, in order to build Doc Ock's pier lair. It had been Spisak's idea to use a collapsed pier as Ock's lair, reflecting an exploded version of the previous lab and representing how Octavius' life had collapsed and grown more monstrous, evoking the cinema of Fritz Lang and the film The Cabinet of Dr. Caligari. Filming then resumed on that set, having taken fifteen weeks to build, occupying Sony's Stage 30. Reshoots for the film continued until December 2003.

For some shots the camera would shoot at six frames per second for a faster playback increasing the sense of speed. Shots using the Spydercam were pre-planned in digital versions of cities, and the camera's movement was controlled with motion control, making it highly cost-effective. The camera system was only used in the previous film for the final shot.

Visual effects
Although roughly the same as before, costume designer James Acheson made numerous subtle changes to Spider-Man's costume. Its colors were made richer and bolder, its spider emblem was given more elegant lines and enlarged, its eye-lenses were somewhat smaller, and its muscle suit underneath was made into pieces, to give a better sense of movement. Also, the helmet Maguire wore under his mask was also improved, with better movement for the false jaw and magnetic eyepieces, which were easier to remove.

The claws of each tentacle, which were called "death flowers", were controlled by one puppeteer sitting on a chair. Each tentacle was controlled by four people, who rehearsed every scene with Molina so that they could give a natural sense of movement as if the tentacles were moving due to Octavius' muscle movement. On set, Molina referred to his tentacles as "Larry", "Harry", "Moe" and "Flo", with "Flo" being the top-right tentacle as it was operated by a female grip and performed delicate operations like removing his glasses and lighting his cigar.

Edge FX was only hired to do scenes where Octavius carries his tentacles. The CGI versions were scanned straight from the real ones to allow them to appear more realistic. However, using the real versions was always preferred to save money, and each scene was always filmed first with Edge FX's creations to see if CGI was truly necessary. In some shots where CGI is used, Molina is replaced by a virtual actor possessing the CGI tentacles. Through the use of motion-capture and cyber-scanning, visual effects supervisor Scott Stokdyk and CGI character animation supervisor Anthony LaMolinara were able to create more detailed virtual actors to replace Maguire and Molina in some shots, as well as make them display natural human motion. Completing the illusion, the sound designers chose not to use servo sound effects, feeling it would rob the tentacles of the sense that they were part of Octavius' body, and instead used motorcycle chains and piano wires.

As with the previous film, John Dykstra served as visual effects designer. Dykstra and his crew sought to make the worst shot of the second movie look as good as the best shot of the first movie. Dykstra not only created the physical appearance of Octavius' tentacles, but also that of the nuclear reaction that Octavius attempts to carry out in the film. The reaction resembles the sun, complete with solar flares, and poses a threat to its immediate environment through its strong gravitational pull, which can draw surrounding objects directly into it and disintegrate them. As mentioned previously, the film's increased budget allowed the reaction to have a significant amount of artistry and reality.

Music 

The film was scored by Danny Elfman, who had a falling out with Director Sam Raimi, saying that composing Spider-Man 2 was a "miserable experience". Christopher Young and John Debney did additional scores for the film.

Release

Marketing
The first teaser trailer was released in December 2003, being attached to the screenings of The Lord of the Rings: The Return of the King. The next trailer then premiered on April 8, 2004 during The Apprentice and in theaters with the release of The Alamo the day after.

Promotional partners included Burger King, Dr Pepper, Kraft Foods, Major League Baseball, Kellogg's, and Embassy Suites Hotels.

Home media
The film was initially released on DVD and VHS on November 30, 2004 in United States, in Australia on November 17, and in the UK on November 26. The DVD was available in both anamorphic widescreen and Pan-and-scan "fullscreen", as well as a Superbit edition and in a box-set with the first film. The film was also the first Sony Pictures movie released in the US under the Sony Pictures Home Entertainment banner, and one of the final titles released outside of North America under the Columbia TriStar Home Entertainment name. There was also a collector's DVD gift set including a reprint of The Amazing Spider-Man #50. The DVD release sold 11,604,597 units and grossed $174,260,344 in the United States. The film was also released on Sony's proprietary Universal Media Disc (UMD) format in 2005, with 1million UMD copies of the film sold in the United States as part of a PlayStation Portable (PSP) bundle. The film received a novelization written by Peter David. The film was released on Blu-ray in October 2007 as a part of the Spider-Man: The High Definition Trilogy box set. It was also released separately on Blu-ray in November 2010 as well as the previous film as part of Sony's Blu-ray Essentials Collection including both the theatrical release and the 2.1 extended cut. All three films were re-released on Blu-ray as part of the Spider-Man: Origins set in 2017.

Spider-Man 2.1 (2007)
An extended cut of the film, entitled Spider-Man 2.1, was released on DVD on April 17, 2007. The cut included eight minutes of new footage, with new special features not included in the original release, as well as a sneak preview of the then-upcoming Spider-Man 3. The cut also featured new, alternate, and extended scenes, and a featurette: "Inside Spider-Man 2.1", detailing the making of the cut. A similar cut aired on January 2, 2007 on the FX channel with an exclusive sneak preview for Spider-Man 3.

Reception

Box office
Spider-Man 2 grossed $373.6 million in the United States and Canada and $415 million in other territories for a total worldwide gross of $788.6 million, against a production budget of $200 million.

Spider-Man 2 opened in the United States on June 30, 2004 and grossed $40.4 million in its first day; this broke its predecessor's opening day record of $39.4 million until it was surpassed a year later by Star Wars: Episode III – Revenge of the Sith ($50.0 million). Playing at 4,152 theaters upon opening, it had the second-highest number of screenings, behind Shrek 2, which had an extra 11, bringing the total to 4,163. The film also broke The Lord of the Rings: The Return of the Kings record ($34.5 million) for the highest-grossing Wednesday of all time. It held the Wednesday record for three years until it was topped by Harry Potter and the Order of the Phoenix ($44.2 million). Its Friday-to-Sunday gross reached a total of $88.2 million, surpassing Austin Powers in Goldmember ($73.1 million) to have the largest July opening weekend. Moreover, Spider-Man 2 also defeated Men in Black II ($52.1 million) for having the biggest Fourth of July opening weekend at the time. The film held the record until 2011 when it was broken by Transformers: Dark of the Moon ($97.9 million). With a total gross of $152.6 million, it surpassed Shrek 2 ($129 million) to have the highest five-day Wednesday opening. In its first six days, the film had grossed over $180 million, which surpassed the previous largest six-day opening record held by The Matrix Reloaded ($146.9 million). Additionally, it had the highest Monday gross of any film, generating a total of $27.6 million. The film would hold this record for a decade until it was eclipsed by Star Wars: The Force Awakens ($40.1 million) in 2015. Spider-Man 2 became the quickest film to hit the $200 million mark, taking eight days to do so. This record would be tied with Revenge of the Sith and Pirates of the Caribbean: Dead Man's Chest. All three films were surpassed by The Dark Knight in 2008.

Internationally, Spider-Man 2 opened in 28 territories and grossed $43 million in its first week. The film set opening records in Brazil, generating $3.1 million on 650 prints, claiming 62% of market share and beating its predecessor's opening weekend by 22%. It took in $6.6 million on 873 prints in Mexico, which was ranked as the country's third largest opening, coming in at 10% less than the original. Spider-Man 2 produced $1.3 million in Malaysia, smashing Godzillas record for having the biggest movie opening in the country. In Indonesia, it was the first film in the country's history to reach $2.3 million, surpassing the previous record held by Titanic. In total, the international grosses include Australia ($17.8 million), France ($40.2 million), Germany ($24.2 million), Italy ($24.4 million), Japan ($59.5 million), Mexico ($20.5 million), South Korea ($13 million), Spain ($18.8 million), and the United Kingdom ($49.7 million).

Critical response
The website's critical consensus reads, "Boasting an entertaining villain and deeper emotional focus, this is a nimble sequel that improves upon the original." Metacritic, which uses a weighted average, gives the film a score of 83 out of 100 based on 41 reviews, indicating "universal acclaim". Audiences polled by CinemaScore gave the film an average grade of "A−" on an A+ to F scale, the same grade earned by the previous film.

Chicago Tribune gave the film three and a half stars out of four, and Mark Caro stated that Alfred Molina was a "pleasingly complex" villain, and the film as a whole "improves upon its predecessor in almost every way." Kenneth Turan, of the Los Angeles Times, gave the film four stars out of five and concurred with Caro when he stated, "Doc Ock grabs this film with his quartet of sinisterly serpentine mechanical arms and refuses to let go." Roger Ebert gave Spider-Man 2 four stars out of four, calling it "the best superhero movie since the modern genre was launched with Superman (1978)", and praising the film for "effortlessly [combining] special effects and a human story, keeping its parallel plots alive and moving." He later called it the fourth best film of 2004." IGN Richard George felt "Sam Raimi and his writing team delivered an iconic, compelling version of Spider-Man's classic foe... We almost wish there was a way to retroactively add some of these elements to the original character." In 2016, James Charisma of Playboy ranked the film #9 on a list of "15 Sequels That Are Way Better Than The Originals". Conversely, J. Hoberman, of The Village Voice, thought the first half of the film was "talky bordering on tiresome", with the film often stopping to showcase Raimi's idea of humor.

Spider-Man 2 has frequently been listed among rankings of the best superhero films. The film was placed 411th on Empire magazine's top 500 movies list, describing the film as "Bigger and better than its predecessor, with a superior villain in Alfred Molina's Doc Ock, and a more confident Raimi sneaking in some of his own trademarks." In 2013, Forbes described it as "Not just one of the greatest sequels, but one of the best films of the genre, period." In 2018, Film School Rejects called it "the best summer movie ever" and said that its "emotional and calculated story stands above modern summer flicks" like those of The Avengers and The Dark Knight.

Accolades

At the 77th Academy Awards, Spider-Man 2 won Best Visual Effects (John Dykstra, Scott Stokdyk, Anthony LaMolinara and John Frazier), and was nominated for Best Sound Mixing (Kevin O'Connell, Greg P. Russell, Jeffrey J. Haboush and Joseph Geisinger) and Best Sound Editing along with The Polar Express, but lost to Ray and The Incredibles, respectively. The film won Saturn Awards for Best Actor, Best Director, Best Fantasy Film, Best Special Effects, and Best Writer, while being nominated for Best Supporting Actor and Best Music. It was nominated for two British Academy Film Awards for Special Visual Effects and Sound, but lost to The Day After Tomorrow and Ray, respectively. The American Film Institute (AFI) listed the film as one of the 2004's ten best films, and nominated it for positions on the lists of the top 10 fantasy films, the 100 most inspiring American films, and the 100 greatest American films.

Sequel 

In March 2004, three months before Spider-Man 2 release, Sony announced that a sequel was already in development. Spider-Man 3 was released on May 4, 2007.

Video game

To coincide with the film's release, a video game of the same name was released for the Game Boy Advance, GameCube, Microsoft Windows, PlayStation 2 and Xbox on June 28, 2004. Releases on the PlayStation Portable, N-Gage, and Nintendo DS systems would follow. An action-adventure video game, it serves as a sequel to the Spider-Man: The Movie (2002). Published by Activision, the console versions were developed by Treyarch, but the other versions had different developers. The console versions and handheld versions of Spider-Man 2 were well received, with the exception of the PC/Mac version. Upon launch, the game had shipped more than 2million units in North America by July 7, 2004.

Legacy
In 2021, Molina was announced to return as Doctor Octopus in Spider-Man: No Way Home (2021), which is part of the Marvel Cinematic Universe and directed by Jon Watts. Molina later clarified in April that the character would be the same iteration as depicted in Spider-Man 2 and his story arc would continue directly from the film's ending.

Notes

References

External links

 

2000s English-language films
2000s superhero films
2000s American films
2004 films
2004 science fiction action films
American action films
American sequel films
Columbia Pictures films
Films directed by Sam Raimi
Films produced by Avi Arad
Films scored by Danny Elfman
Films set in New York City
Films set in Columbia University
Films shot in Chicago
Films shot in Los Angeles
Films shot in New York City
Films that won the Best Visual Effects Academy Award
Film and television memes
Internet memes
Internet memes introduced in 2004
Films with screenplays by Alvin Sargent
Films with screenplays by Michael Chabon
Green Goblin
IMAX films
Mad scientist films
Spider-Man (2002 film series)
Spider-Man films
Live-action films based on Marvel Comics